Danny Bakker (born 16 January 1995) is a Dutch professional footballer who plays as a midfielder for NAC Breda.

Career
Bakker began his career with ADO Den Haag. He made his professional debut in a 4–0 defeat against Vitesse Arnhem on 16 March 2013.

In August 2020, Bakker agreed to a contract extension with ADO Den Haag until June 2021.

Bakker joined Eerste Divisie club Roda JC Kerkrade on loan for the 2020–21 season in October.

On 21 July 2021, he joined NAC Breda on a two-year contract.

Career statistics

References

External links
 
 
 Netherlands profile at Ons Oranje

1995 births
Living people
Sportspeople from Voorburg
Association football midfielders
Dutch footballers
Netherlands under-21 international footballers
Netherlands youth international footballers
Eredivisie players
Eerste Divisie players
ADO Den Haag players
Roda JC Kerkrade players
NAC Breda players
Footballers from South Holland